= Gharas Well =

- Gharas Well بئر غرس (Arabic)
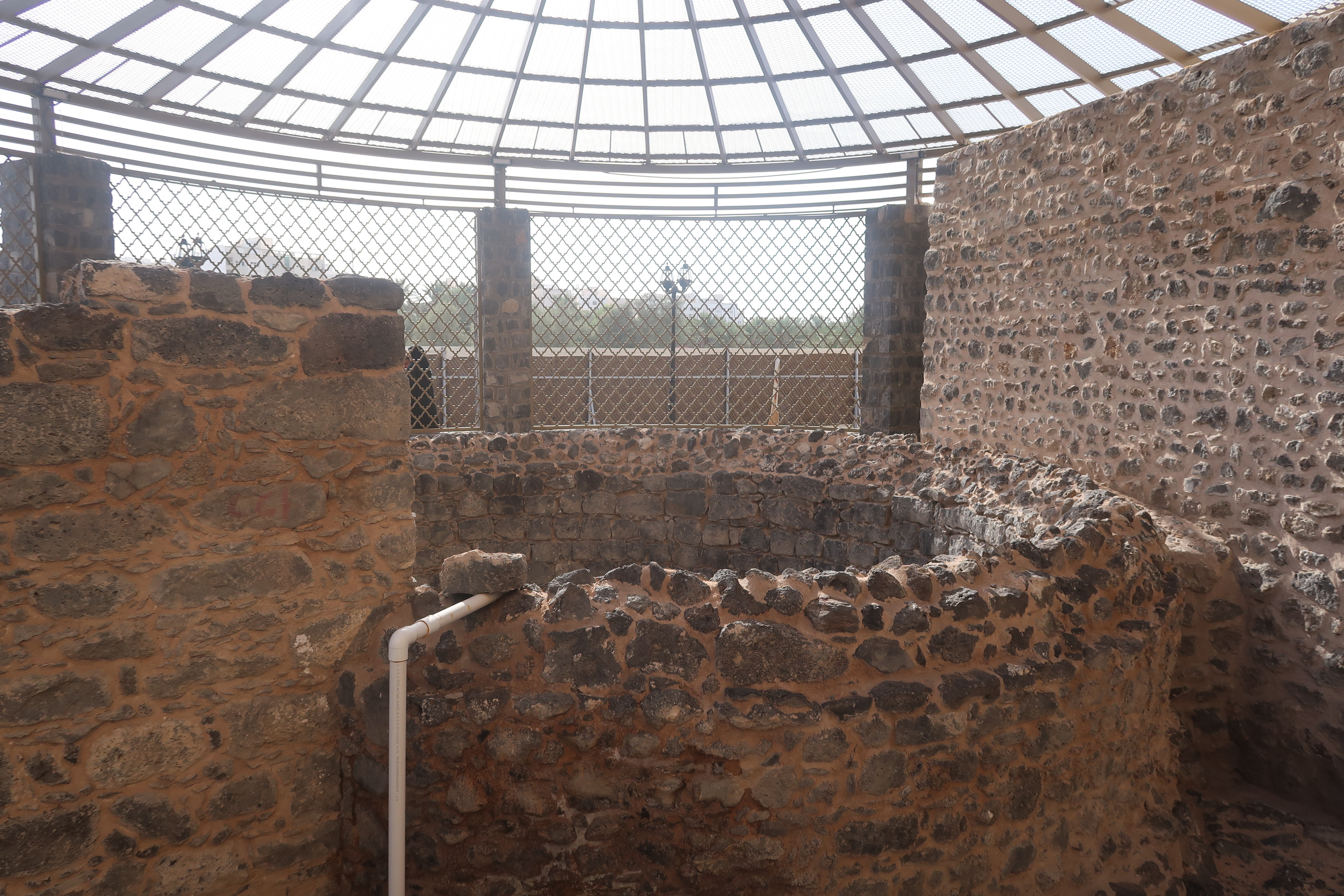
- Gharas Well

- Location of Gharas Well in Medina, Saudi Arabia
- 24.44519°N 39.62939°E
- Location: Medina

Gharas Well (Arabic: بئر غرس) is one of the ancient wells in Medina, Saudi Arabia, and is considered a site associated with the Prophetic biography.

== Location ==
It is located on the eastern side of Medina, near the Quba area.

== Significance ==
- It is narrated that the Prophet drank from its water.
- It is also reported that he instructed that his body be washed with its water after his death, indicating the purity and blessed nature of its water.

== Its status today ==
The well is still known, and its location is identified. It is one of the historical landmarks in Medina visited by those interested in the Seerah.

== See also ==
- Medina
- Sacred waters

== Gallery ==
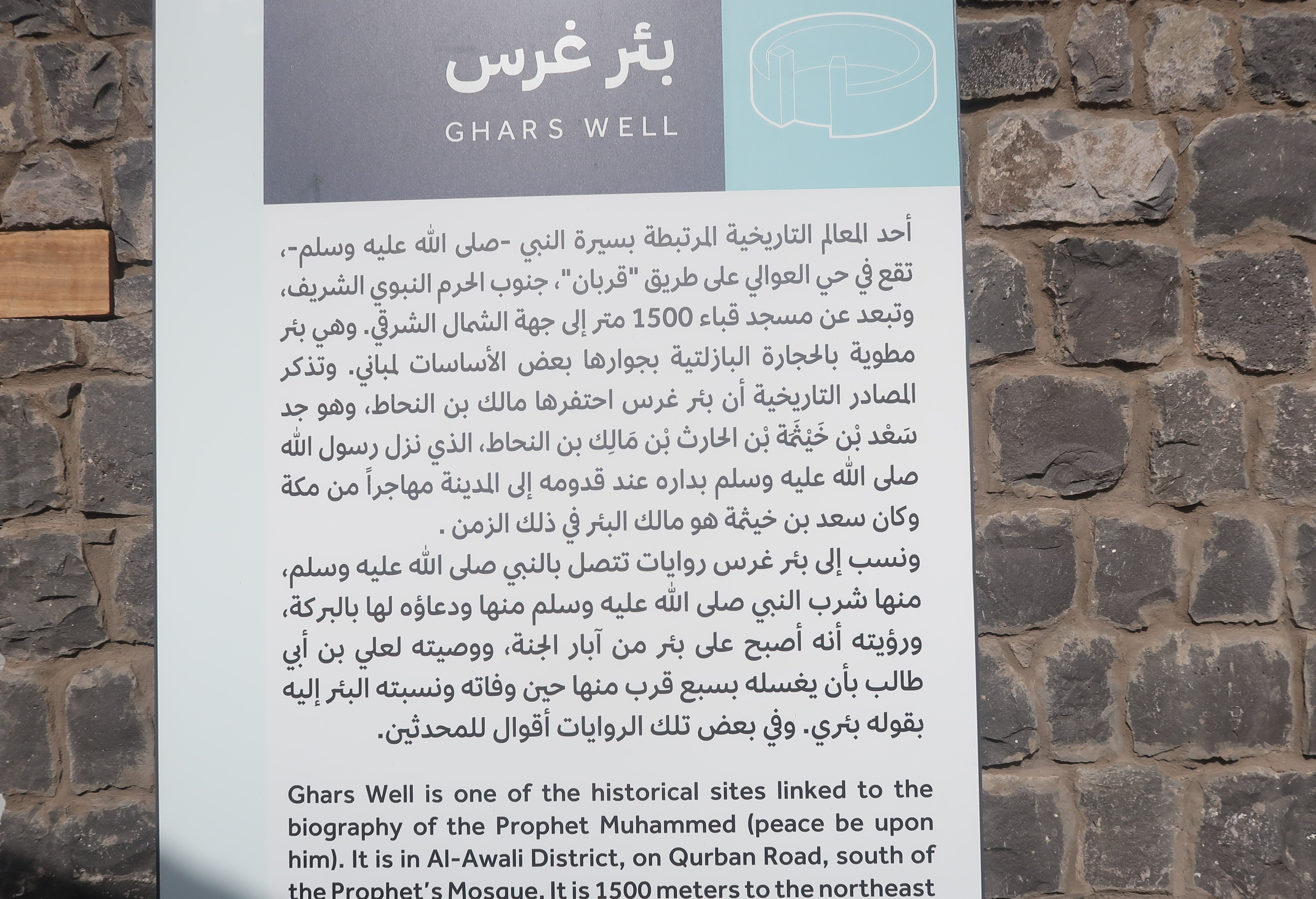
Gharas Well

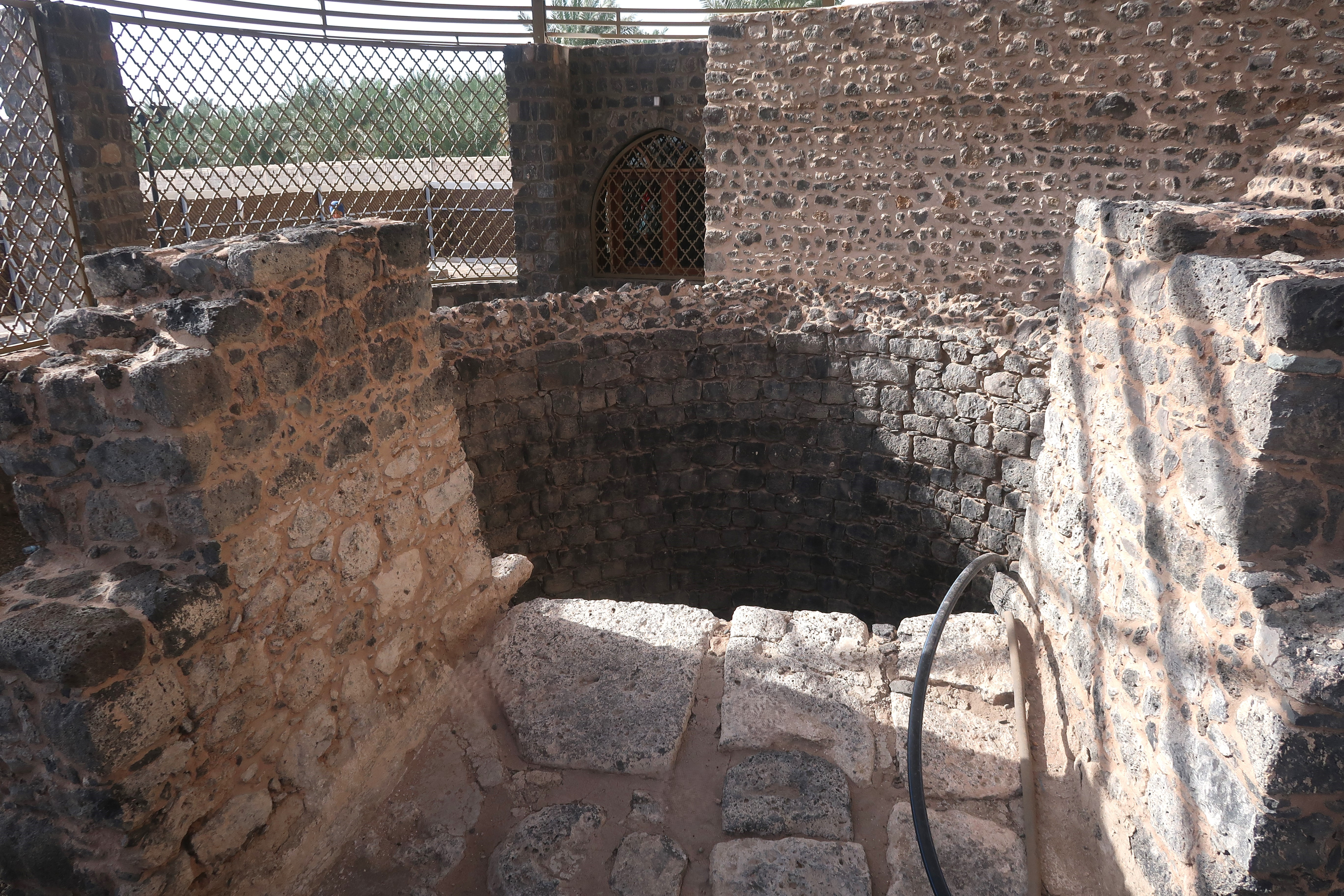
Gharas Well
